Storm Catcher is a 1999 American action film starring Dolph Lundgren and directed by Tony Hickox, who also co-stars in the film. New Zealand model and actress Kylie Bax debuts as Jessica Holloway. The film tells the story of a renegade general who plans to bomb Washington, D.C. with a new stealth fighter. Although intended for a larger audience, Storm Catcher, after a short theatrical run, was released direct-to-video.

Plot
Flanked by buddy Sparks Johnson on the ground, and co-pilot Lucas in the air, Major Jack Holloway flies America's top secret "Phoenix" stealth-capable fighter jet. While Holloway's mentor, General William Jacobs, keeps FBI agents Lock and Load from snooping into his pet project, Holloway and Sparks enjoy some R&R with Holloway's wife Jessica and daughter Nicole.

It turns out Lucas is an operative for the "Serpent Killers", an intra-military right-wing group, and temporarily assuming Holloway's identity, he steals the Phoenix. Holloway is accused of the murders of the guards that protect the aircraft, Branded a pariah, Holloway not only gets court martialed but he is also nearly obliterated when his prison transport is ambushed and blown up.

Determined to clear his name, Holloway escapes. After he touches base with his family, extremist soldiers shoot Jessica and later kidnap Nicole. No sooner does Sparks convince Lock and Load of Holloway's innocence than Lucas guns them down and kidnaps Sparks. However, Jacobs tells Holloway that if he ever wants to see Nicole alive again, Holloway must bomb the White House.

Cast

 Dolph Lundgren as Major Jack Holloway
 Mystro Clark as Captain "Sparks" Johnson
 John Pennell  as Captain Lucas
 Robert Miano as General William Jacobs
 Yvonne Zima as Nicole Holloway
 Kylie Bax as Jessica Holloway 
 Jody Jones as  Sergeant McGarry
 Robert Glen Keith as Sergeant Stanley
 Tony Hickox as FBI Agent Load
 Kimberley Davies as FBI Agent Lock
 Rudy Mettia as Commando
 Burt Goodman as Old Guy
 Richard Bjork as Bubba Pickles
 Andreea Radutoiu as Havens
 Phil Culotta as Commando #1
 Mark Delasandro as Commando #2

Production

Filming
Storm Catcher is set and filmed primarily in Los Angeles, California with B-roll footage in Washington, D.C., taking place in 18 days from October 19 to November 6, 1998. The Phoenix aircraft used for filming, relying mostly on stock shots, was the Lockheed F-117 Nighthawk stealth fighter aircraft. The McDonnell Douglas F-15 Eagle pictured on the film's movie poster (designed for pre-sales and financing before being produced or having a finished script) was never seen in the film. The other main aerial adversary in the film was the Grumman F-14 Tomcat.

Release

Home media
Storm Catcher premiered on HBO before landing on VHS and DVD. It was released on January 4, 2000 by Columbia TriStar Home Video. Although not critically reviewed in major media outlets, the film did garner some attention from other film reviewers. David Parkinson of Radio Times rated Storm Catcher, 1/5 stars and wrote, "Faced with a minuscule budget, a few feet of stock aerial footage and a script with dialogue that amounts to an aural assault, director Anthony Hickox has done well to produce a film that's only as bad as this one."

Reception

Critical response
Robert Pardi of TV Guide rated it 2/5 stars and wrote, "As action fodder goes, this Lundgren vehicle benefits from solid wild blue yonder photography and enthusiastically executed assault sequences. As the bombs fall on familiar terrain and the fists smash into standard-issue bad guys, however, the landscape fills with deja-vu."

See also
 List of American films of 1999

References

External links
 
 
 

1999 films
1999 direct-to-video films
1999 action films
American action films
American aviation films
Films about aviation accidents or incidents
Films about terrorism in the United States
Films set in Los Angeles
Films set in Washington, D.C.
Films directed by Anthony Hickox
Franchise Pictures films
1990s English-language films
1990s American films